The IBM System/360 Model 85 is a high-end member of the System/360 family of computers, with many advanced features, and was announced in January 1968 and first shipped in December 1969. IBM built only about 30 360/85 systems because of "a recession in progress".

Models
The four models of the 360/85 are: I85 (512K), J85 (1M), K85 (2M) and L85 (4M), configured with two IBM 2365 Processor Storage units, four 2365 units, an IBM 2385 Processor Storage unit Model 1 (=2M), or an IBM 2385 Processor Storage unit Model 2 (=4M) respectively. The I85 includes two-way interleaved memory while the others provide four-way interleaving of memory access.

Advanced/special features
  The system console is L-shaped: one leg is the Main Control Panel, including a CRT, and the other leg includes 2 screens: "Microfiche Document Viewer" and "Indicator Viewer."
  Memory Cache - depending on the model and the situation, "the effective system storage cycle becomes one-third to one-fourth of the actual main storage cycle."  The memory cache is high-speed, static buffer memory situated between the CPU and main system memory ("Level 1" cache), available in 16 KB and 32 KB size options. The System/360 Model 85 is the first commercially available computer with cache memory. 
 Monolithic integrated circuits
  Enhanced floating point - The Model 85 comes with extended-precision 128-bit quadruple-precision floating point
  The Model 85 has both Read-only and Writeable Control Storage (it is the second System/360 to have writeable control storage; the IBM System/360 Model 25 is the first to have rewriteable control storage; the 360/85 was introduced Jan. 30, 1968).

Emulation

The 360/85, when equipped with the 709/7090/7094 Compatibility Feature,
with the use of an emulator program permits running 709, 7040, 7044, 7094 and 7094 II programs.

Gateway to the future
In some respects, the System/360 Model 85 provided a glimpse into the future System/370 product line (particularly the 370 Model 165) - which IBM announced two years later (1970).  It used the MST circuitry that was later used in the initial System/370 models, and introduced features such as 128-bit floating point arithmetic and block multiplexor channels that are also part of the System/370 architecture.

The 360/85 uses microcode to control instruction execution, unlike the completely-hardwired 360/75 and 360/91; the high-end models of System/370 also use horizontal microcode, except the IBM System/370 model 195.

References

System/360 Model 85